USS Roselle has been the name of more than one United States Navy ship, and may refer to:

, a minesweeper in commission from September to December 1917
 (later MSF-379), a minesweeper in commission from 1944 to 1945